Paul Gladstone Mahorn (born 13 August 1973) is an English former football forward. He spent 1992 to 1998 with Tottenham Hotspur, but only played three Premier League games, and was also loaned out to Fulham and Burnley. In 1998, he played one game for Port Vale, before moving into non-league circles with Stevenage Borough, Cambridge City, and Cambridge United.

Career
Mahorn started his career with Tottenham Hotspur and made his Premier League debut on 22 January 1993, in a 2–1 defeat to Swindon Town at the County Ground. He played three Second Division games on loan with Don Mackay's Fulham in the 1993–94 season. He played eight Second Division games whilst on loan with Adrian Heath's Burnley in the 1995–96 season. He scored his first and only goal in the Football League on 30 March, in a 4–1 defeat to Wycombe Wanderers at Adams Park. After failing to make an appearance for Brentford on loan in March 1997, Mahorn returned to "Spurs" in time for a run of three games in September 1997, one in the League Cup against Carlisle United (in which he scored) and two in the Premier League. He left White Hart Lane after an FA Cup encounter with Fulham on 5 January 1998. He signed with John Rudge's Port Vale in March 1998, but only played the one game in the First Division and was not signed for the 1998–99 season. He later had brief spells with Stevenage Borough (Conference), Cambridge City (Southern League) and Cambridge United before the former top-flight player disappeared off the football scene.

Career statistics
Source:

References

1973 births
Living people
English footballers
Black British sportspeople
Association football forwards
Tottenham Hotspur F.C. players
Fulham F.C. players
Burnley F.C. players
Port Vale F.C. players
Brentford F.C. players
Stevenage F.C. players
Bishop's Stortford F.C. players
Cambridge City F.C. players
Cambridge United F.C. players
Premier League players
English Football League players
National League (English football) players
Southern Football League players